Georgi Atanasov may refer to:

Georgi Atanasov (politician) (1933–2022), Bulgarian Prime Minister, 1986–1990
Georgi Atanasov (composer) (1882–1931), Bulgarian composer
Georgi Atanasov (rower) (born 1947), Bulgarian Olympic rower
Georgi Atanasov (footballer)